General elections were held in Belgium on 11 April 1954. The dominant Christian Social Party won 95 of the 212 seats in the Chamber of Representatives and 49 of the 106 seats in the Senate. Voter turnout was 93.2%. Elections for the nine provincial councils were also held.

The outgoing Catholic government led by Jean Van Houtte lost their majority in parliament. The two other main parties, the Socialist and Liberal Party, subsequently formed a rare "purple" government with Achille Van Acker as Prime Minister. Both parties had an anti-clerical agenda and aimed to reverse policies of the Catholic government regarding private schools. This would become known as the Second School War.

Results

Chamber of Deputies

Senate

References

1954 elections in Belgium
April 1954 events in Europe